Elections of members of East Suffolk District Council in Suffolk, England are held every four years, following the merger of Waveney and Suffolk Coastal districts to form the new East Suffolk district in April 2019. 55 councillors are elected to the chamber, with 29 wards each electing either one, two or three representatives. The first elections to East Suffolk District Council were held on 2 May 2019.

Political control

Leadership
During the shadow period leading up to the council's creation in 2019, the shadow authority was led by Mark Bee, leader of the outgoing Waveney District Council. He was unsuccessful in securing a seat on the new council at its first elections in May 2019. From East Suffolk Council's first meeting after coming into effect, the leader of the council has been:

Council elections
2019 East Suffolk District Council election

References

 
Council elections in Suffolk
District council elections in England